The Thomas P. Kennard House, also known as the Nebraska Statehood Memorial, is the oldest  remaining building in the original plat of Lincoln, Nebraska. Built in 1869, the Italianate house belonged to Thomas P. Kennard, the first Secretary of State for Nebraska, and one of three men who picked the Lincoln site for the new state's capital in  1867. The house was designed by architect John Keys Winchell of Chicago.

In 1965 the Kennard House was designated the Nebraska Statehood Memorial, and became a museum. It was placed on the National Register of Historic Places on April 16, 1969.

The house is a -story  stuccoed brick building with a frame cupola on the shallow-pitched hip roof. The house was extensively altered inside and out before its designation as a memorial and required major restoration work to return its appearance to its original state.

Kennard, Nebraska is named for Thomas P. Kennard.

See also
List of the oldest buildings in Nebraska

References

External links

 - Nebraska State Historical Society

Houses on the National Register of Historic Places in Nebraska
Italianate architecture in Nebraska
Houses completed in 1869
Museums in Lincoln, Nebraska
Historic American Buildings Survey in Nebraska
Historic house museums in Nebraska
Houses in Lancaster County, Nebraska
1869 establishments in Nebraska
National Register of Historic Places in Lincoln, Nebraska
History Nebraska